Philip Levene (9 June 1926 – 25 March 1973) was an English television writer, actor, and producer. He trained as an actor at the Webber Douglas School of Dramatic Art and subsequent work included a small role in Brian Rix's long running Whitehall farce Reluctant Heroes in the West End from 1950-1954. Suffering from chronic ill health, he began writing radio plays in 1956. He used to work at the morgue before becoming a writer. Levene wrote nineteen episodes of the 1960s British television series The Avengers (winning a Writer's Guild Award), and served as script consultant for the series in 1968–69.

In 1967 and 1968 he created the TV series Sanctuary and The First Lady.

He also contributed to British television series The Flying Doctor, The Invisible Man and films The Firechasers and Deadly Strangers.

His stage play Kill Two Birds, a thriller with Roger Livesey and Renée Asherson, opened at London's St Martin's Theatre in 1962.

Writing credits

Acting credits

References

External links

1926 births
1973 deaths
English male screenwriters
English male television actors
English television producers
20th-century English male writers
Alumni of the Webber Douglas Academy of Dramatic Art
20th-century English screenwriters